Anthony Howard (born 30 September 1979) is a male English former competitive swimmer and freestyler who represented Great Britain in the Olympics and European championships, and England in the Commonwealth Games.

Swimming career
Howard was part of the bronze medal-winning British 4×50-metre freestyle teams at the 2000 and 2005.

He represented Great Britain at the 2000 Olympic Games in Sydney in the men's 4×100-metre freestyle relay however the team did not progress beyond the heats.

Howard attended three Commonwealth Games representing England in 1998, 2002 and 2006. He won a bronze medal for England at the 1998 Games in Kuala Lumpur, Malaysia in the 4×100-metre freestyle relay.

See also
List of British records in swimming

References

External links
British Swimming athlete profile

1979 births
Living people
English male swimmers
Olympic swimmers of Great Britain
Swimmers at the 2000 Summer Olympics
Commonwealth Games medallists in swimming
Commonwealth Games bronze medallists for England
Swimmers at the 1998 Commonwealth Games
Swimmers at the 2002 Commonwealth Games
Swimmers at the 2006 Commonwealth Games
Medallists at the 1998 Commonwealth Games